Titana may refer to:
Lecithocera, a genus of insect
Titana (Sicyon), a town of ancient Greece